Nazia Haque Orsha is a Bangladeshi actress and model. Orsha has two younger sisters, Priya and Chadni.  She was born in Mirpur, Dhaka. She was a participant in 2009 beauty contest Lux Chanel I Super Star. She got the 4th position. She has acted in more than 100 TV dramas. She also has acted in several films and telefilms.. She studied in Kishaloya Girls' School and College.

Film
 Ferari Manush
 Prarthona
 Raian
 Adharer Oboshan
 Orpita
 1971: Sei Shob Din
 Ditiyo Koishor
 Networker Baire

Telefilms
 Sonchalok
 Unfit
 Ekti Raater Golpo
Mr. Handsome (2018)
Ajo Sei Tumi(2020)
 Mr.K (2021)

TV serial
Vadro Para 
Saatkahon (2017)
Chandful Omabasya (চাঁদফুল অমাবস্যা)
Ekantoee Tumi (একান্তই তুমি)
Priyo (প্রিয়)
Ful Mohol (2017)
Khayesh

Web series

TV drama

TVC
 Wheel
 Number 1 condensed milk
 Marcel Fridge

Awards 
Charunirom

References

External links

Living people
21st-century Bangladeshi actresses
Bengali television actresses
People from Chittagong
Bangladeshi female models
1991 births